In software testing, monkey testing is a technique where the user tests the application or system by providing random inputs and checking the behavior, or seeing whether the application or system will crash. Monkey testing is usually implemented as random, automated unit tests.

While the source of the name "monkey" is uncertain, it is believed by some that the name has to do with the infinite monkey theorem, which states that a monkey hitting keys at random on a typewriter keyboard for an infinite amount of time will almost surely type a given text, such as the complete works of William Shakespeare. Some others believe that the name comes from the classic Mac OS application "The Monkey" developed by Steve Capps prior to 1983. It used journaling hooks to feed random events into Mac programs, and was used to test for bugs in MacPaint.

Monkey Testing is also included in Android Studio as part of the standard testing tools for stress testing.

Types of monkey testing
Monkey testing can be categorized into smart monkey tests or dumb monkey tests.

Smart monkey tests 
Smart monkeys are usually identified by the following characteristics:
 Have a brief idea about the application or system
 Know its own location, where it can go and where it has been
 Know its own capability and the system's capability
 Focus to break the system
 Report bugs they found
Some smart monkeys are also referred to as brilliant monkeys, which perform testing as per user's behavior and can specify some probabilities of bugs to be occurred.

Dumb monkey tests 
Dumb monkeys, also known as "ignorant monkeys", are usually identified by the following characteristics:
 Have no knowledge about the application or system
 Don't know if their input or behavior is valid or invalid
 Don't know their or the system's capabilities, nor the flow of the application
 Can find fewer bugs than smart monkeys, but can also find important bugs that are hard to catch by smart monkeys

Advantages and disadvantages

Advantages 
Monkey testing is an effective way to identify some out-of-the-box errors. Since the scenarios tested are usually ad-hoc, monkey testing can also be a good way to perform load and stress testing. The intrinsic randomness of monkey testing also makes it a good way to find major bugs that can break the entire system. The setup of monkey testing is easy, therefore good for any application. Smart monkeys, if properly set up with an accurate state model, can be really good at finding various kinds of bugs.

Disadvantages 
The randomness of monkey testing often makes the bugs found difficult or impossible to reproduce. Unexpected bugs found by monkey testing can also be challenging and time consuming to analyze. In some systems, monkey testing can go on for a long time before finding a bug. For smart monkeys, the ability highly depends on the state model provided, and developing a good state model can be expensive.

Similar techniques and distinctions 
While monkey testing is sometimes treated the same as fuzz testing and the two terms are usually used together, some believe they are different by arguing that monkey testing is more about random actions while fuzz testing is more about random data input. Monkey testing is also different from ad-hoc testing in that ad-hoc testing is performed  without planning and documentation and the objective of ad-hoc testing is to divide the system randomly into subparts and check their functionality, which is not the case in monkey testing.

See also

Random testing

References 

Software testing